Rinorea pectino-squamata is a species of plant in the Violaceae family. It is endemic to French Guiana.

References

Endemic flora of French Guiana
pectino-squamata
Vulnerable plants
Taxonomy articles created by Polbot